Sophus Wangøe (1873–1943) was a Danish cinematographer of the silent era.

Selected filmography
 Towards the Light (1919)
 Ilona (1921)
 The Women of Gnadenstein (1921)
 The Passion of Inge Krafft (1921)
 The Inheritance of Tordis (1921)
 Tragedy of Love (1923)
 The Countess of Paris (1923)
 Zaida, the Tragedy of a Model (1923)
 Debit and Credit (1924)
 Thamar, The Child of the Mountains (1924)
 Anne-Liese of Dessau (1925)
 The Director General (1925)
 Lace (1926)
 The Great Duchess (1926)
 The Woman's Crusade (1926)
 The World Wants To Be Deceived (1926)
 Artists (1928)
 Luther (1928)

References

Bibliography 
 John T. Soister. Conrad Veidt on Screen: A Comprehensive Illustrated Filmography. McFarland, 2002.

External links 
 

1873 births
1943 deaths
Danish cinematographers